Evžen Vohák (born 15 March 1975) is a Czech retired football player who played in the Czech First League for SK České Budějovice and Dukla Prague. He played for amateur side FK Jiskra Třeboň later in his career, leaving after the autumn part of the 2008–09 season.

References

External links
 

1975 births
Living people
Czech footballers
Czech Republic under-21 international footballers
Association football midfielders
Czech First League players
SK Dynamo České Budějovice players
Dukla Prague footballers